Raja Rajan may refer to:

 Raja Raja Chola I (died 1014), an emperor of the Tamil Chola Empire
 Raja Rajan (film), a 1957 Tamil language film